Aguilares is a municipality in the San Salvador department of El Salvador, located 33 km away from the city of San Salvador. The municipality measures 33.72 km² and as of 2006, had an estimated population of 73,300. Sugar cane cultivation is the major economic activity for the area.

The municipality is divided into five administrative divisions, called cantones: Florida, Las Tunas, Pinalitos, Pishishapa, and Los Mangos. It is bounded on the north by El Paisnal, on the east by Suchitoto (Cuscatlán Department) and Guazapa, to the south by Nejapa and Guazapa, and to the west by Quezaltepeque (La Libertad Department) and El Paisnal.

Toponymy
The municipality was named in honor of Nicolás, Vicente and Manuel Aguilar, leaders in the Salvadoran independence movement.

Notable events 
In the 1970s, the associated Catholic parish of Aguilares was served by Rutilio Grande, a Jesuit priest and activist who was assassinated in the fields near El Paisnal, a neighboring village. For this reason, the Aguilares area figures prominently in the film Romero, a biography of martyred Archbishop Óscar Romero, which shows Grande's work in and around Aguilares just before his death in 1977.

Municipalities of the San Salvador Department